Robert John Spencer (born February 12, 1969), known as J. Robert Spencer, is an American musical theatre and television actor, who was nominated for a Tony Award for his work in the Broadway musical Next to Normal.

He graduated cum laude in 1991 from the Shenandoah University musical theatre program, and received an Honorary Doctorate of Fine Arts in 2009.

His Broadway debut was as a "swing" in the musical Side Show in 1997. He appeared in the musical Weird Romance in April 2004 at the York Theatre, New York, and the musical God Bless You, Mr. Rosewater in April 2005 at the York Theatre. He went on to star as "Nick Massi" in the original Broadway cast of the musical Jersey Boys (2005).

He starred in the Broadway musical Next to Normal, for which he received a Tony Award nomination as Best Actor in a Musical. He was also in the Arena Stage production (2008) and received a Helen Hayes Award nomination for Outstanding Lead Actor in a Non-Resident Production. He departed the production on May 16, 2010 and was succeeded by original Off-Broadway cast member Brian d'Arcy James.

Spencer starred as Abraham Lincoln in the 2014 New York Musical Theatre Festival production of Bayonets of Angst, a bluegrass musical comedy about the Civil War.  Spencer was awarded a New York Musical Theatre Festival Award for Excellence for "Outstanding Individual Performance."

He also has formed his own company, "7 Spencer Productions", for which he produces, writes, directs and acts in his own low-budget movies.

As a voice actor, Spencer was the voice of Seita in the anime movie, Grave of the Fireflies.

For television he has appeared on Law & Order, All My Children, and Girls Behaving Badly.

Spencer is married to actress Jenny-Lynn Suckling, and they have two children.

Filmography

TV Series
 Law & Order – Lt. Mason
 Law & Order: Special Victims Unit – Joseph Soltice

Short
 High Expectations – Worthington
 The Quest – Narrator

Movies
 Amon Saga – Mabo, Messenger (voices)
 Farm Girl in New York – Alan
 Grave of the Fireflies – Seita (Central Park Media Dub) (voice)
 Heterosexuals – Larry
 Lost on Purpose – Loan Officer Don
 Night of the Dog – Bob
 The Ascension – Hitchhiker Bob
 The Vanilla Series – Masao Sera (voice)

Broadway Credits

References

External links

 
Official site
J. Robert Spencer: “NEXT TO NORMAL is a perfect piece” – interview in todoMUSICALES.com

1969 births
Living people
American male musical theatre actors
American male stage actors
American male television actors
Place of birth missing (living people)